The 1958 Green Bay Packers season was their 40th season overall and their 38th season in the National Football League.

In the immortal words of New York sportswriter and Green Bay native Red Smith: "they overwhelmed one opponent, under-whelmed ten, and whelmed one." The tie came in week two and the three-point win in week five; during the seven-game losing streak to end the season the Packers lost by an average margin of over 22 points and got no closer than ten. The Packers finished 1958 allowing a league-worst 382 points in the 12-game season (31.8 points per game).

McLean was the top assistant on the coaching staff in 1957 and was given a one-year contract as head coach after Lisle Blackbourn was fired in early January 1958 with a year remaining ($25,000) on a five-year contract. Following the final game of the 1958 season, McLean resigned on December 17, which paved the way for the historic hiring of Vince Lombardi in January 1959.

The underachieving 1958 team was loaded with talent, with future hall of famers Bart Starr, Paul Hornung, Jim Taylor, Ray Nitschke, Jim Ringo, Bobby Dillon, Forrest Gregg, and Jerry Kramer, as well as future All-Pros Ron Kramer, Max McGee, Bill Forester, and Dan Currie.

Offseason

NFL draft 

The first four rounds of the 1958 Draft were conducted in early December 1957, when Blackbourn was head coach. The remaining 26 rounds were selected in late January. This draft by the Packers is regarded as among the best in NFL history.

 Yellow indicates a future Pro Bowl selection
 Green indicates a future Pro Football Hall of Fame inductee

Regular season

Schedule 

Note: Intra-conference opponents are in bold text.

Standings

Roster

Awards, records, and honors

Milestones 
 Worst regular season record in franchise history

References 

 
 

Green Bay Packers seasons
Green Bay Packers